Robert Henry Armstrong (born 1 October 1952) is an Australian politician. He was elected to the Tasmanian Legislative Council on 3 May 2014 as the independent member for Huon, defeating high-profile Liberal opponent Peter Hodgman. Prior to his election he served as mayor of Huon Valley Council for 13 years. He was defeated in 2020 by Labor candidate Bastian Seidel.

References

1952 births
Living people
Members of the Tasmanian Legislative Council
Independent members of the Parliament of Tasmania
Mayors of places in Tasmania
21st-century Australian politicians